Sládkovičovo (until 1948 Diosek) is a town in the Galanta District, Trnava Region in southwestern Slovakia.

Geography
It is located on the Danubian Lowland, in the region known as Dolné Považie (Lower Váh region) on the Dudváh river, around 45 km east of Slovak capital Bratislava and 8 km from district seat Galanta.

History
The first written record about the town was in 1252 in a document of King Béla II of Hungary, possibly named after a forest with walnut trees. In 1530 it was raided by the Ottomans. It received town privileges in 1582 and in the 17th century a royal way was passing through the town, but in 1709 the town burned down. Throughout time, the Church, later Erdődys, Esterházys and in the 19th century Zichys owned the town. During the reign of Joseph II, German farmers and craftsmen settled in the village and two separate villages were created - smaller German Diószeg and larger Hungarian Diószeg. In 1850 a railway track from Pressburg to Budapest was built and the town gained a railway station and in 1867 a sugar factory was built. Later in 1870 the settlement got renewed town privileges. After break-up of Austria-Hungary in 1918, the town passed into Czechoslovakia, confirmed by the Treaty of Trianon in 1920. As a result of the First Vienna Award the town belonged from 1938 to 1945 to Hungary. In 1948 the town was renamed from Diosek to Sládkovičovo in the honor of Andrej Sládkovič, a Slovak poet.

Demographics
According to the 2001 census, the town had 6,078 inhabitants. 59.46% of inhabitants were Slovaks, 38.50% Hungarians, 0.92% Roma and 0.53% Czechs. The religious makeup was 66.78% Roman Catholics, 18.02% people with no religious affiliation and 9.62% Lutherans.

Twin towns – sister cities

Sládkovičovo is twinned with:
 Csorvás, Hungary
 Diosig, Romania
 Ivančice, Czech Republic

References

External links
Official website

Cities and towns in Slovakia
Hungarian communities in Slovakia